Jamaica competed at the 1996 Summer Olympics in Atlanta, United States.

Medalists

Gold
 Deon Hemmings — Athletics, Women's 400 metres Hurdles

Silver
 Merlene Ottey-Page — Athletics, Women's 100 metres
 Merlene Ottey-Page — Athletics, Women's 200 metres
 James Beckford — Athletics, Men's Long Jump

Bronze
 Merlene Ottey-Page, Juliet Cuthbert, Michelle Freeman, Nikole Mitchell, Gillian Russell (heats), and Andria Lloyd (heats) — Athletics, Women's 4x100 metres Relay
 Michael McDonald, Davian Clarke, Greg Haughton, Roxbert Martin, Dennis Blake (heats), and Garth Robinson (heats) — Athletics, Men's 4x400 metres Relay

Results by event

Athletics

Men's 100 metres
Michael Green
Ray Stewart
Leon Gordon

Men's 200 metres
Percy Spencer
Elston Cawley

Men's 400 metres
Roxbert Martin
Davian Clarke
Michael McDonald

Men's 800 metres
Alex Morgan
Clive Terrelonge

Men's 4 × 400 m Relay
Michael McDonald, Dennis Blake, Roxbert Martin, Gregory Haughton, and Davian Clarke
 Heat — 3:02.81
 Semi Final — 2:58.42
 Final — 2:59.42 (→  Bronze Medal)
 
Men's 400m Hurdles
Neil Gardner
 Heat — 48.59s
 Semifinal — 48.30s (→ did not advance)

Dinsdale Morgan
 Heat — 49.16s (→ did not advance)

Winthrop Graham
 Heat — did not finish (→ did not advance)

Men's Marathon
 Antonio Nils — 2:44.10 (→ 104th place)

Women's 4x400 metres Relay 
 Merlene Frazer, Sandie Richards, Juliet Campbell, and Deon Hemmings
 Qualification — 3:25.33
 Final — 3:21.69 (→ 4th place)

Women's 400m Hurdles
Deon Hemmings
 Qualification — 54.70
 Semifinals — 52.99
 Final — 52.82 (→  Gold Medal)

Debbie Parris
 Qualification — 55.64
 Semifinals — 54.72
 Final — 53.97 (→ 4th place)

Catherine Scott-Pomales
 Qualification — 56.21 (→ did not advance)

Women's Long Jump
Diane Guthrie-Gresham
 Qualification — 6.27m (→ did not advance)

Lacena Golding
 Qualification — NM (→ did not advance)

Dionne Rose
 Qualification — DNS (→ did not advance)

Women's Triple Jump
 Suzette Lee
 Qualification — 13.65m (→ did not advance)

Women's Heptathlon 
 Diane Guthrie-Gresham
 Final Result — 6087 points (→ 16th place)

Boxing

Men's Featherweight (– 57 kg)
Tyson Gray
 First Round — Lost to Pablo Chacón (Argentina), 5-6

Men's Light Middleweight (– 71 kg)
 Sean Black
 First Round — Lost to Jørn Johnson (Norway), 7-13

Men's Middleweight (– 75 kg)
Rowan Donaldson
 First Round — Lost to Alexander Lebziak (Russia), 4-20

Sailing

Men's Two Person Dinghy
Andrew Gooding
Joseph Stockhausen

Swimming

Men's 50m Freestyle
 Sion Brinn
 Heat – 23.35 (→ did not advance, 29th place)

Men's 100m Freestyle
 Sion Brinn
 Heat – 50.38
 B-Finals – 50.09 (→ 12th place)

Table Tennis

Men's singles
 Michael Hyatt
 Stephen Hylton

Men's doubles
 Michael Hyatt
 Stephen Hylton

See also
 Jamaica at the 1994 Commonwealth Games
 Jamaica at the 1995 Pan American Games
 Jamaica at the 1998 Commonwealth Games

References

sports-reference
Official Olympic Reports
International Olympic Committee results database

Nations at the 1996 Summer Olympics
1996 Summer Olympics
Olympics